Môle-Saint-Nicolas Airport  is an airstrip  northeast of Môle-Saint-Nicolas, a commune in the Nord-Ouest Department of Haiti. The runway is at the base of a small  peninsula that forms the bay of Môle. There is rising terrain southeast of the airport. The airport temporarily hosted the Haiti Air Corps as a secondary airbase to Bowen Field.

See also
Transport in Haiti
List of airports in Haiti

References

External links
OpenStreetMap - Môle-Saint-Nicolas

Airports in Haiti